Hesdigneul-lès-Boulogne (literally Hesdigneul near Boulogne) is a commune in the Pas-de-Calais department in the Hauts-de-France region of France.

Geography
The A16 autoroute forms the western border of the commune and the river Liane the north and eastern.

Population

Places of interest
 The church of St. Eloi, dating from the nineteenth century.

See also
Communes of the Pas-de-Calais department

References

Hesdigneullesboulogne